Graziano Pellè (born 15 July 1985) is an Italian professional footballer who plays as a striker.

Pellè began his career at local Serie A club Lecce, and was loaned to three lower-division sides before moving to the Dutch club AZ in 2007. He won the Eredivisie title in his second of four seasons at the club. After brief spells back in Italy with Parma and Sampdoria, he returned to the Dutch top flight, where his consistent scoring for Feyenoord earned Pellè an £8 million transfer to Southampton in July 2014. In July 2016, after two seasons in the Premier League, Pellè moved to Shandong Luneng for an estimated transfer fee of £12 million.

Pellè represented Italy at under-20 and under-21 level. He also played for the nation's Olympic team in 2008, but was not selected for the tournament. He scored on his senior international debut in 2014 and represented Italy at UEFA Euro 2016, where the team reached the quarter-finals.

Club career

Lecce
Born in San Cesario di Lecce, Province of Lecce, Pellè is from Monteroni di Lecce. He could have chosen ballroom dancing as his profession after becoming national under-12s champion in partnership with his sister Fabiana. He started playing for local club Lecce's youth teams; his father Roberto was a striker for Lecce in Serie C. Graziano won two Campionato Primavera titles and the 2002 Coppa Italia Primavera. He made his Serie A debut on 11 January 2004 in 1–2 home defeat against Bologna, making a total of two appearances in the season.

In January 2005, Pellè was loaned out to Catania in Serie B, being regularly used but failing to find the net. In the summer, he participated in the 2005 FIFA World Youth Championship with the under-20 team, scoring four goals in an eventual quarter-final exit, and returned to Lecce for the 2005–06 campaign, only to be loaned again in the winter transfer window, again to the second division, now to Crotone.

In 2006–07 Pellè was yet again loaned to a level two club, this time to Cesena, where he had a breakthrough year with ten goals.

AZ
In July 2007, Pellè lost all ties to Lecce and signed for Eredivisie outfit AZ. He stated in an interview that he had a choice of staying at Lecce, who would loan him to Palermo, but chose the Alkmaar club instead because of its willingness to give chances to young players. His debut season, however, was largely unfruitful, as he struggled to replace PSV-bound Danny Koevermans, and finished his first season with just 3 goals in 27 games (16 starts).

On 28 December 2008, Pellè scored the winning goal in a 1–0 win against NEC. In February of the following year, he netted twice in a 3–0 home success over Groningen, but was overall sparingly used by the North Holland side over the course of four Eredivisie seasons, being released in June 2011.

Parma
In early July 2011, Parma confirmed through its official website that Pellè had signed a multi-year contract with the club. He scored one goal during his time at Parma, netting its second goal in a come from behind 3–3 draw with his former club Lecce on 18 December 2011; this was his first goal in Serie A. On 31 January 2012, Pellè joined Sampdoria on loan in the second division, scoring 4 goals in 16 appearances for the club to help it earn promotion back to Serie A for 2012–13.

Feyenoord
For the 2012–13 season, still owned by Parma, Pellè returned to the Netherlands, joining Feyenoord to become the first Italian to play for the club. He scored 11 goals in his first ten games, including a last-minute strike in a 2–2 home draw against Ajax and both goals in a 2–0 success over RKC Waalwijk, also at De Kuip. On 23 December, he scored twice more as Feyenoord beat Groningen 2–1 in the last game of the Eredivisie season before the winter break.

On 5 January 2013, Pellè signed a four-year contract with the Rotterdam club, to be effective 1 July. His first goal since securing a permanent move to Feyenoord came on 30 January, scoring on a pass from Jean-Paul Boëtius as Feyenoord eventually fell to a 2–1 defeat to PSV. On 28 April, he scored a first-half brace as Feyenoord notched an impressive 6–0 victory over Heracles. At the end of the campaign, he had netted 27 league goals, ranking second in the domestic charts and also surpassing the recent records of Italian scorers in a foreign league – Luca Toni (Bayern Munich) and Christian Vieri (Atlético Madrid) – in the process.

Pellè was also famous for his "retro" haircut among Feyenoord fans. In home games, many fans showed the same haircut as Pellè and there are still some tutorials on YouTube that teach how to arrange his hairstyle.

Pellè netted all three goals for Feyenoord on 25 August 2013, notching a 3–1 win over NAC Breda, and securing the club's first points of the new Eredivisie season. He opened the scoring for Feyenoord in the seventh minute of their UEFA Europa League second leg play-off match against Kuban Krasnodar to bring the sides level at 1–1 on aggregate, but the Dutch side conceded twice and fell to a 3–1 aggregate defeat. He scored another hat-trick for Feyenoord on 29 September 2013, scoring with each foot and from the penalty spot as the Rotterdam side defeated ADO Den Haag 4–2. He scored twice more on 1 December, netting in either half as Feyenoord defeated rivals PSV 3–1.

On 8 February 2014, Pellè scored twice and also missed a penalty as Feyenoord came from a goal down to defeat NEC 5–1. On 2 March, he opened the scoring with a header from a Bruno Martins Indi cross, but retrospectively received a red card for an elbow to the face of Joël Veltman and a four-match ban as Feyenoord fell 2–1 to rivals Ajax. After sitting out the ban, Pellè returned to the team on 6 April and scored a brace in Feyenoord's 2–0 win over RKC Waalwijk. His 15th and last league goal for Feyenoord came on 27 April, nodding in a Ruud Vormer corner as Feyenoord defeated Cambuur 5–1.

Southampton

2014–15 season
Pellè signed a three-year deal for £8 million with Premier League side Southampton in July 2014, reuniting him with his former AZ and Feyenoord coach Ronald Koeman. Pellè made his competitive debut for the club on 17 August in its first game of the new league season, playing the full 90 minutes of a 2–1 defeat at Liverpool. On 26 August, he scored his first competitive goal for the club in a 2–0 victory over Millwall in the Second Round of the League Cup. His first league goal for the club came four days later in a 3–1 away win over West Ham United. He scored twice more in Southampton's next match, a 4–0 home win over Newcastle United on 13 September, to secure its second league win in as many games. On 27 September, Pellè won a match for Southampton against Queens Park Rangers with an overhead kick, which was later deemed "world class" by opposing manager Harry Redknapp.

Pellè won the Premier League Player of the Month award for September, with Koeman named the Manager of the Month, and he followed this up with two goals in an 8–0 victory over Sunderland on 18 October. He scored another brace in a League Cup victory over Stoke City on 29 October, helping his side reach the quarter-finals of the competition for the first time in ten years. These were his 8th and 9th goals in his last 12 games.

On 11 April 2015, Pellè scored his first Premier League goal of the year in a 2–0 win over Hull City at St. Mary's Stadium, ending a run of 15 league matches without scoring. Two weeks later, in a 2–2 draw against Tottenham Hotspur, Pellè scored both goals for his team; a strike after overpowering Ben Davies, and a header from a cross by Shane Long.

2015–16 season
Pellè scored Southampton's first goal in a European competition since 2003 when he opened a 3–0 Europa League third qualifying round home leg win over Vitesse on 30 July 2015. A week later, it took him four minutes to open a 2–0 win in the away leg. In Southampton's first match of the league season, away to Newcastle, he headed in right-back Cédric's cross to open a 2–2 draw. He scored twice against Manchester United on 20 September, albeit in a 2–3 home loss. Pellè then scored his fifth of the season against Chelsea in a 3–1 win at Stamford Bridge, scoring Southampton's third goal of the match from a tight angle.

Shandong Luneng
Pellè left Southampton for Chinese club Shandong Luneng on 11 July 2016, for an estimated fee of £12 million. He became the world's seventh-highest paid footballer, earning £350,000 per week. Pellè made his debut for the club in a 1–1 draw with Liaoning Whowin on 16 July 2016. Four days later, he scored his first goal in a 4–1 victory over Hangzhou Greentown.

Return to Parma
On 5 February 2021, Pellè agreed to a return to Parma on a six-month deal. On 19 March, almost 10 years since his last goal in Serie A, Pellé scored with an overhead kick in Parma's match against Genoa.

International career

Pellè scored four goals for Italy under-20 at the 2005 FIFA World Youth Championship in the Netherlands, including a brace in their 4–1 group stage win over Canada. He also netted an extra-time equaliser for a 2–2 draw with Morocco in the quarter-finals, and converted in the penalty shootout which his team lost nonetheless.

After a successful loan spell with Cesena, Pellè earned a call-up to the Italian under-21 side at the 2007 UEFA European Under-21 Football Championship, where he collected three appearances, all as a substitute. In the fifth-place playoff match against Portugal, he scored the first penalty kick in the shootout win, with a Panenka-style penalty. The win secured Italy the final European spot at the 2008 Olympic Games in Beijing. He was part of the preparation for the tournament but was ultimately not selected to the final 22-man squad for the Olympics.

On 4 October 2014, Pellè received his first call up to the Italy senior side for the Azzurris UEFA Euro 2016 qualifying matches against Azerbaijan and Malta. He made his debut as a starter away to Malta on 13 October 2014, scoring the only goal of the game from close range after a corner in the 29th minute. He netted a second goal in the 29th minute on his third appearance on 31 March 2015, heading Italy into the lead in a 1–1 friendly draw against England at Juventus Stadium in Turin. On 3 September 2015, he finished Antonio Candreva's cross for the only goal of the home qualifier against Malta in Florence. He scored the match-winning goal in Italy's 2–1 home win over Norway on 13 October, which allowed Italy to top their Euro 2016 qualifying group and extended their unbeaten run in European qualifying to 50 matches; Pellè was also Italy's top scorer during the qualifying campaign, with three goals.

On 31 May 2016, Pellè was included in Italy manager Antonio Conte's 23-man squad for Euro 2016. In Italy's opening game, on 13 June against Europe's top-ranked team Belgium in Lyon, Pellè played the full match and volleyed a strike into the back of the net in added time for a 2–0 win. In the round of 16 at Stade de France in Paris on 27 June, he struck a volley in the 91st minute to give the Azzurri a 2–0 win over defending champions Spain. On 2 July, he missed a penalty in a 6–5 shoot-out defeat to defending World Cup champions Germany in the tournament quarter-finals. In the events after the match, Pellè issued an apology to the fans of the national team stating, "Do my Euros remain positive? I couldn't care less right now, I am just sad and want to apologise to all Italians. If I had scored that penalty, I'd have become a phenomenon, but instead... I arrived here as a nobody and I leave as a nobody." He also denied provoking Germany goalkeeper Manuel Neuer by making the "chip" gesture.

Although moving his football career to China over the summer, new coach Gian Piero Ventura called Pellè back for international duty for a friendly against France and a 2018 FIFA World Cup qualifier against Israel on 1 and 5 September 2016, scoring in both matches, as Italy suffered a 3–1 home defeat to France but defeated Israel away, 3–1. He was called again for World Cup qualifying matches against Spain and Macedonia on 6 and 9 October, however he was later excluded from the Macedonia match after being substituted in the 59th minute during the Spain game and refusing to shake the hand of coach Ventura.

Style of play
Described as a traditional "target-man" with an eye for goal, Pellè is a large, strong and hard-working striker who excels in the air due to his height and physical attributes. As a centre-forward, he is known for his powerful and accurate finishing ability with his head and feet, as well as his accurate volleys and penalty-kick taking; he is also capable of using his strength and solid first touch to hold up the ball with his back to goal, and either link-up with other players or create chances for teammates. Labelled as a "late bloomer" by sportswriter James Horncastle, Pellè's playing style and characteristics have led him to be compared to compatriot Luca Toni in the Italian media. Pellè has also drawn praise in the media for his work-rate off the ball, and has been described as a mobile forward, who chases down and presses his opponents.

Career statistics

Club
As of match played 22 May 2021.

International

International goals
As of match played 5 September 2016.
Italy score listed first, score column indicates score after each Pellè goal.

HonoursAZ Eredivisie: 2008–09Shandong Luneng Taishan Chinese FA Cup: 2020Italy U21Toulon Tournament: 2008Individual'''Voetbal International Player of the Year: 2012–13
Premier League Player of the Month: September 2014
Chinese Super League Team of the Year: 2019

Notes

References

External links

 
 
 
 National team data  
 Graziano Pellè at Voetbal International'' 

1985 births
Living people
Sportspeople from the Province of Lecce
Footballers from Apulia
Italian footballers
Association football forwards
Serie A players
Serie B players
U.S. Lecce players
Catania S.S.D. players
F.C. Crotone players
A.C. Cesena players
Parma Calcio 1913 players
U.C. Sampdoria players
Eredivisie players
AZ Alkmaar players
Feyenoord players
Premier League players
Southampton F.C. players
Chinese Super League players
Shandong Taishan F.C. players
Italy international footballers
Italy youth international footballers
Italy under-21 international footballers
Italian expatriate footballers
Expatriate footballers in the Netherlands
Italian expatriate sportspeople in the Netherlands
Expatriate footballers in England
Italian expatriate sportspeople in England
Expatriate footballers in China
Italian expatriate sportspeople in China
UEFA Euro 2016 players